A handheld personal computer (PC) is a pocket-sized computer typically built around a clamshell form factor and is significantly smaller than any standard laptop computer, but based on the same principles. It is sometimes referred to as a palmtop computer, not to be confused with Palmtop PC which was a name used mainly by Hewlett-Packard.

Most handheld PCs use an operating system specifically designed for mobile use. Ultra-compact laptops capable of running common x86-compatible desktop operating systems are typically classified as subnotebooks. The first hand-held device compatible with desktop IBM personal computers of the time was the Atari Portfolio of 1989. Other early models were the Poqet PC of 1989 and the Hewlett Packard HP 95LX of 1991 which run the MS-DOS operating system. Other DOS-compatible hand-held computers also existed. After 2000 the handheld PC segment practically halted, replaced by other forms, although later communicators such as Nokia E90 can be considered to be of the same class.

The name Handheld PC was used by Microsoft from 1996 until the early 2000s to describe a category of small computers having keyboards and running the Windows CE operating system.

Microsoft's Handheld PC standard
The Handheld PC (with capital "H") or H/PC for short was the official name of a hardware design for personal digital assistant (PDA) devices running Windows CE. The intent of Windows CE was to provide an environment for applications compatible with the Microsoft Windows operating system, on processors better suited to low-power operation in a portable device. It provides the appointment calendar functions usual for any PDA.

Microsoft was wary of using the term "PDA" for the Handheld PC. Instead, Microsoft marketed this type of device as a "PC companion".

To be classed as a Windows CE Handheld PC, the device must:
 Run Microsoft's Windows CE
 Be bundled with an application suite only found through an OEM Platform Release and not in Windows CE itself
 Use ROM
 Have a screen supporting a resolution of at least 480×240
 Include a keyboard (except tablet models)
 Include a PC card slot
 Include an infrared (IrDA) port
 Provide wired serial and/or Universal Serial Bus (USB) connectivity

HP's first displays' widths were more than a third larger than that of Microsoft's specification. Soon, all of their competition followed. Examples of Handheld PC devices are the NEC MobilePro 900c, HP 320LX, Sharp Telios, HP Jornada 720, IBM WorkPad Z50, and Vadem Clio. Also included are tablet computers like the Fujitsu PenCentra 130, and even communicators like the late Samsung NEXiO S150.

In 1998 Microsoft released the Palm-size PC, which have smaller screen sizes and lack keyboards compared to Handheld PC. Palm-size PC became Pocket PC in 2000.

Due to limited success of Handheld PC, Microsoft focused more on the keyboard-less Pocket PC. In September 2000, the updated Handheld PC 2000 was announced which is based on version 3.0 of Windows CE. 
Interest in the form factor overall quickly evaporated, and by early 2002 Microsoft were no longer working on Handheld PC, with its distinct functionality removed from version 4.0 of Windows CE. HP and Sharp both discontinued their Windows CE H/PCs in 2002, while NEC was last to leave the market in 2005. However, some manufacturers abandoned the format even before Microsoft did, such as Philips and Casio.

See also

References

 
Mobile computers
Windows CE devices

de:Handheld PC
lt:Delninis kompiuteris